Lake Babyna is a lake, located  southwest of Polotsk, Belarus. The water volume is 6,07 mln m ³.

The slopes of the valley range in height from 7 to 40 m and are covered with pasture or forest. The shores are low, with sand and clay soils.

References
Блакітная кніга Беларусі. — Мн.: БелЭн, 1994.

Babyna